USS Yarrow (SP-1010) was a United States Navy patrol vessel in commission from 1917 to 1919.

Yarrow was built in 1913 as a private wooden-hulled motorboat of the same name by Kargard at Chicago, Illinois. In 1917, the U.S. Navy acquired Yarrow from her owner, K. D. Clark, for use as a section patrol boat during World War I. She was commissioned on 27 July 1917 as USS Yarrow (SP-1010) and the Navy formally acquired her from Clark under a free lease on 27 August 1917.

Assigned to the 9th Naval District, Yarrow patrolled the waters of Lake Michigan for the rest of the 1917 Great Lakes shipping season. After being laid up for the winter of 1917-1918 while the lakes were frozen over, she resumed her patrol duties in the spring of 1918 and continued them through the end of the 1918 shipping season late in the year. 
 
The Navy returned Yarrow to Clark on 7 March 1919 and she was stricken from the Navy List the same day.

Notes

References

Department of the Navy Naval History and Heritage Command Online Library of Selected Images: U.S. Navy Ships: USS Yarrow (SP-1010), 1917-1919. Previously the civilian motor boat Yarrow (1913)
NavSource Online: Section Patrol Craft Photo Archive Yarrow (SP 1010)

Patrol vessels of the United States Navy
World War I patrol vessels of the United States
Ships built in Chicago
1913 ships
Great Lakes ships